Agenda is a New Zealand hour-long current affairs television programme. It screened at 10 am on Sundays on TV One. Its final host was Rawdon Christie with political interviews conducted by Guyon Espiner. Christie and Espiner were joined each week by three panelists from the New Zealand media.

In late November 2008 TVNZ announced they would not continue their contract with Frontpage, the producers. Despite speculation that another network might buy the rights, the programme was discontinued in 2009 and Q+A replaced it in the Sunday morning slot.

Format
The show began with Rawdon Christie talking to that week's panelists about the main political events of the previous week. Later on, Guyon Espiner begun interviewing their guests, after which the panelists ask the guest their own questions. Following an ad break, there is the dairy segment and an in-depth look into a major political event before another interview. The show concluded with a book giveaway.

Every week near the beginning of the show a pre-recorded segment by the NZ Listener's Jane Clifton running through what has happened in the political week.
Also every week a reporter would visit a dairy and talk to the owner about a significant event that has occurred in their area.
Each week a student from the University of Auckland would present the results from a student panel that separates political fact from fiction.

Panellists
Vernon Small,  political editor of The Dominion Post
John Roughan, assistant editor of The New Zealand Herald
Andrew Holden, editor of The Press
Virginia Larson, North & South editor
Bernard Hickley, freelance commentator and blogger
Kathryn Ryan, host of Radio New Zealand national's Nine to Noon
Nevil Gibson, editor in chief of the National Business Review
Colin Espiner, political editor of The Press and Guyon Espiner's brother
Chris Trotter, managing editor of the Political Press and columnist
Richard Long, columnist for Fairfax
David Beatson, formerly directly involved in the media and politics
Chris Baldock, the editor of the Sunday News
Brian Fallow, economics editor of The New Zealand Herald
Brent Edwards,  Radio New Zealand's political editor
Deborah Hill Cone, freelance journalist
Dr Colin James, veteran political journalist
Barry Soper, Newstalk ZB political editor

References

External links
 https://web.archive.org/web/20040502031054/http://www.agendatv.co.nz/

1990s New Zealand television series
2000s New Zealand television series
1999 New Zealand television series debuts
2009 New Zealand television series endings
New Zealand television news shows
TVNZ 1 original programming